Crepidotus carpaticus, is a species of saprophytic fungus in the family Crepidotaceae with a stipeless sessile cap.   The fungus was described by Albert Pilát in 1929 and is commonly found in France, the United Kingdom, and Ireland.  The GBIF database indicates this species may be an orthographic variant.

Identification works
The BioImages field guide lists the following works for identification of C. carpaticus.

References

Crepidotaceae